The  Kansas City Chiefs season was the franchise's 12th season in the National Football League and 22nd overall. They improved from 1980 from an 8–8 record to a 9–7 record (their first winning season in 8 years) but missing the playoffs for the tenth consecutive season.

Bill Kenney began the 1981 season as the club's starting quarterback and directed the Chiefs to a 6–2 start, including a 37–33 win over the Pittsburgh Steelers at Three Rivers Stadium on Opening Day. 2nd round draft choice, running back Joe Delaney electrified the club's offense by rushing for 1,121 yards, a team single-season record at the time. He was named the AFC's Rookie of the Year and became the first running back to represent the franchise in the Pro Bowl. Delaney registered a 193-yard performance in a 23–10 victory against the Oilers on November 15, the best single-game total ever amassed by a Kansas City rookie.

Owning an 8–4 record with four games remaining, the Chiefs were poised to make the playoffs for the first time in 10 years before hitting a three-game losing skid. Bill Kenney missed the club's final three contests due to injury as Steve Fuller temporarily reclaimed the starting quarterback position and guided the club to a 10–6 win at Minnesota, in the final contest played at Metropolitan Stadium. With the Chiefs winning the game, Vikings fans began dismembering the stadium as early as the second half—taking seats, pieces of the scoreboard and even chunks of sod as souvenirs. The victory assured the Chiefs of a 9–7 record, the club's first winning mark since 1973 as coach Marv Levy increased the club's victory total for a third consecutive year. Inspired by the Washington Redskins's "Hail to the Redskins," Levy penned a fight song for the Chiefs called "Give a Cheer for Kansas City" which never caught on.

Offseason

NFL draft

Personnel

Staff

Roster

Schedule

Preseason

Regular season

Note: Intra-division opponents are in bold text.

Game summaries

Week 1: at Pittsburgh Steelers

Week 2: vs. Tampa Bay Buccaneers

Week 3: vs. San Diego Chargers

Week 4: at Seattle Seahawks

Week 5: at New England Patriots

Week 6: vs. Oakland Raiders

Week 7: vs. Denver Broncos

Week 8: at Oakland Raiders

Week 9: at San Diego Chargers

Week 10: vs. Chicago Bears

Week 11: vs. Houston Oilers

Week 12: vs. Seattle Seahawks

Week 13: at Detroit Lions

Week 14: at Denver Broncos

Week 15: vs. Miami Dolphins

Week 16: at Minnesota Vikings

Standings

References 

Kansas City Chiefs
Kansas City Chiefs seasons
Kansas